Roberto Novoa (born August 15, 1979) is a former pitcher in Major League Baseball.

Minor league career
Novoa was signed on July 3, 1999, by the Pittsburgh Pirates as a non-drafted free agent. He played a season of rookie ball in 2000 and spent 2001 with the Single-A Williamsport Crosscutters. On December 16, 2002, he was traded to the Detroit Tigers completing a deal for Randall Simon.

Major league career
Novoa made his major league debut on July 29 against the Chicago White Sox. Eight days later, he earned his first victory against the Boston Red Sox. Novoa entered in relief of Mike Maroth in the sixth inning with the bases loaded and two outs with the Tigers up 3-2. After walking Kevin Youkilis to tie the game, Novoa struck out the next four batters to gain the victory.
On February 9, 2005, Novoa was traded to the Chicago Cubs along with minor leaguers Scott Moore and Bo Flowers for Kyle Farnsworth.

He played 49 games for the Cubs in relief in 2005, pitching 44.2 innings with 47 strikeouts. In 2006, he entered 66 games, pitching 76 innings with 53 strikeouts. He was on the disabled list for the entire 2007 season with a shoulder injury.

On October 16, 2007, Novoa was claimed off waivers by the Baltimore Orioles. He was released by the Orioles on July 29, 2008. On July 30, he signed with the San Francisco Giants and became a free agent at the end of the 2008 season. He played briefly for the Diablos Rojos del México of the Mexican League in 2009, appearing in 7 games before being released in April. In 2010, he appeared in 18 games for the Acereros de Monclova, also in the Mexican League. On March 21, 2011, it was announced he signed a deal with the York Revolution.

References

External links

1979 births
Living people
Acereros de Monclova players
Baseball players at the 2015 Pan American Games
Central American and Caribbean Games gold medalists for the Dominican Republic
Chicago Cubs players
Detroit Tigers players
Diablos Rojos del México players
Dominican Republic expatriate baseball players in Mexico
Dominican Republic expatriate baseball players in the United States
Erie SeaWolves players
Fresno Grizzlies players
Hickory Crawdads players
Iowa Cubs players
Lakeland Tigers players

Leones de Yucatán players
Major League Baseball players from the Dominican Republic
Major League Baseball pitchers
Mexican League baseball pitchers
Norfolk Tides players
Olmecas de Tabasco players
Williamsport Crosscutters players
Competitors at the 2010 Central American and Caribbean Games
Central American and Caribbean Games medalists in baseball
Pan American Games competitors for the Dominican Republic